Anatoli Rubinov is a politician from Belarus who served as Speaker of Council of the Republic. In 2015, he stepped down from his post.

References 

Speakers of the Council of the Republic of Belarus
Living people
Year of birth missing (living people)